Ectoedemia hadronycha is a moth of the family Nepticulidae and belongs to the Fomoria subgenus of Ectoedemia. It is endemic to Australia, where it is found along the north-eastern coast of Queensland.

The larvae feed on Capparis arborea, of which they mine the leaves. Eggs are found on the upper side of the leaves.

References

Moths of Australia
Nepticulidae
Moths described in 2000